Far From Over, Edwin McCain's fourth album, was the last album of his to be released by Lava Records, about six months before he was dropped from their roster. It was issued on June 19, 2001. It was recorded at Pedernales Studios in Austin, Texas.

Track listing
All tracks composed by McCain except "I've Seen a Love" composed by McCain and Duane Evans.
 "Far From Over" - 4:15
 "Hearts Fall" - 4:31
 "Sun Will Rise" - 4:14
 "I've Seen a Love" - 4:40
 "Write Me a Song" - 4:42
 "Letter To My Mother" - 3:31
 "Get Out of This Town" - 3:36
 "Kentucky" - 2:55
 "Radio Star" - 2:59
 "Dragons" - 3:59
 "One Thing Left To Do" - 6:26
 "Jesus, He Loves Me" - 5:28

Personnel
Greg Archilla - producer, engineer, digital editing, mixing
Scott Bannevich - bass, producer
Bob Becker - viola
Bo Becker - viola
Charlie Bisharat - violin
Larry Chaney - guitar (acoustic), mandolin, guitar (electric), producer, lap steel guitar
Larry Corbett - cello
Mario de Leon - violin
Joel Derouin - violin
Karl Egsieker - assistant
Matt Funes - viola
Richard Furch - assistant
Dave Harrison - percussion, drums, producer, loop programming
Derrick Jackson - keyboards
Jacqueline Johnson - vocals (background)
Suzie Katayama - cello
Peter Kent - violin
Brian Leonard - violin
Edwin McCain - guitar (acoustic), guitar (electric), vocals, producer
Vladimir Meller - mastering
Alan Messer - design, photography
Kevin Paige - assistant
Craig Shields - director, keyboards, saxophone, producer, wind controller
Ryan Williams - assistant

Charts
Album

Singles

References

External links

2001 albums
Edwin McCain albums
Lava Records albums